was a Japanese actor. He worked in TV and film from 1951 to 1997. His birth name was Nobuyuki Okamura (岡村 信行). He was born in Ōdate, Akita, Japan.

He played the role of the Iga ninja Tombei the Mist (Kiri no Tonbei) in the Edo period historical drama TV series The Samurai. This series became a surprise hit in Australia in 1965 and was the first Japanese TV series shown in that country.

Major movie roles
Akakage (1969)
Miyamoto Musashi (1973)
Legend of Dinosaurs & Monster Birds (1977)
Billiken (1996)

Major TV roles
Leopard Eye (1959-1960)
The Samurai (1962-1965)
Akakage (1967-1968)
Gokenin Zankurō (1995-1998)

References

External links
 

1930 births
1998 deaths
Japanese male film actors
20th-century Japanese male actors